Before the Act of Union 1707, the barons of the shire or stewartry of Kirkcudbright elected commissioners to represent them in the unicameral Parliament of Scotland and in the Convention of Estates. The number of commissioners was increased from one to two in 1690.

After 1708, Kirkcudbrightshire was represented by one Member of Parliament in the House of Commons of Great Britain at Westminster.

List of shire commissioners
 1612: Sir Robert Gordon of Lochinvar and William McCulloch of Mertoun
 1617: William McCulloch of Mertoun
 1628–33, 1639–40: Sir Patrick McKie of Larg
 1641: Alexander Gordon of Earlston
 1643: John Gordon of Cardines
 1644: William Grierson of Bargatton
 1645: John Gordon of Cardines
 1645: William Grierson of Bargatton
 1645–46: John Broun of Carsluith
 1646–47, 1648–49: William Grierson of Bargatton
 1661–63: David McBrair of Newark and Alnagill
 1665, 1667: George Maxwell of Munches
 1669–74: Sir Robert Maxwell of Orchardton
 1678: Richard Murray of Broughton
 1681–82: Sir Robert Maxwell of Orchardton
 1685–86: Hugh Wallace of Ingliston
 1689 (convention), 1689–1702: Hugh McGuffock of Rusco 
 1690–93: William Gordon of Craig (died c.1693)
 1693–1702: Patrick Dunbar of Machrimore
 1702–07: William Maxwell of Cardoness
 1702–1703: John Murray of Broughton
 1704–07: Alexander McKie of Palgowan

References

See also
 List of constituencies in the Parliament of Scotland at the time of the Union

Shires represented in the Parliament of Scotland (to 1707)
Constituencies disestablished in 1707
1707 disestablishments in Scotland
History of Dumfries and Galloway
Politics of Dumfries and Galloway